40 The Green is a grade II listed building on The Green, Southgate, London. The house dates from the early nineteenth century with later alterations. It bears a local blue plaque that reads, "In 1881 this house became the first seat of local government in Southgate", referring to the separation of Southgate from Edmonton in that year.

See also
Sandford House & Norbury House

References

External links

Grade II listed buildings in the London Borough of Enfield
Southgate, London
Houses in the London Borough of Enfield
Grade II listed houses in London